Patrick Walsh (January 1, 1892 – December 25, 1978) of Detroit was a member of the Michigan Senate 1949–1954. He was a Democrat.

External links
Political Graveyard

1892 births
1978 deaths
People from Jarrow
Politicians from Tyne and Wear
Politicians from Detroit
Democratic Party Michigan state senators
20th-century American politicians